The 7th annual Berlin International Film Festival was held from 21 June to 2 July 1957. The International Federation of Film Critics awarded FIPRESCI Award for the first time this year. The Golden Bear was awarded to the American film 12 Angry Men directed by Sidney Lumet.

Jury
The following people were announced as being on the jury for the festival:

International feature film jury
 Jay Carmody, theatre critic (United States) - Jury President
 Jean de Baroncelli, writer and film critic (France)
 John Sutro, producer (United Kingdom)
 Dalpathal Kothari (India)
 Fernaldo Di Giammatteo, historian and film critic (Italy)
 Bunzaburo Hayashi, producer (Japan)
 Miguel Alemán Jr., producer (Mexico)
 Thorsten Eklann, journalist (Sweden)
 José María Escudero, director of photography (Spain)
 Edmund Luft, playwright, historian and film critic  (West Germany)
 Ernst Schröder, actor (West Germany)

International documentary and short jury
 Adolf Hübl, founder of the Bundesstaatliche Hauptstelle für Lichtbild und Bildungsfilm (Austria) - Jury President
 Paul Heimann, pedagogue (West Germany)
 Paul Louyet, producer (Belgium)
 Norman McLaren, director and producer (Canada)
 Karl Naef, (Switzerland)
 Yrjö Rannikko, producer (Finland)
 Ahmed Sefrioui, writer (Morocco)

Films in competition
The following films were in competition for the Golden Bear award:

Key
{| class="wikitable" width="550" colspan="1"
| style="background:#FFDEAD;" align="center"| †
|Winner of the main award for best film in its section
|}

Awards

The following prizes were awarded by the Jury:

International jury awards
 Golden Bear: 12 Angry Men by Sidney Lumet
 Silver Bear for Best Director: Mario Monicelli for Padri e figli
 Silver Bear for Best Actress: Yvonne Mitchell for Woman in a Dressing Gown
 Silver Bear for Best Actor: Pedro Infante for Tizoc
 Silver Bear Extraordinary Jury Prize: ex aequoAmanecer en Puerta Oscura by José María ForquéKabuliwala by Tapan Sinha

Documentaries and short films jury awards
 Golden Bear (Documentaries): The secrets of nature by James Algar
 Silver Bear (Documentaries): L'ultimo paradiso by Folco Quilici
 Short Film Golden Bear: Gente lontana by Lionetto Fabbri
 Silver Bear for Best Short Film: ex aequo:Plitvička jezera by Šime ŠimatovićTausend kleine Zeichen by Herbert SeggelkeBig Bill Blues by Jean Delire

Independent jury awards
FIPRESCI Award
Woman in a Dressing Gown by J. Lee Thompson
Honourable mention: Be Dear to Me by Annelise Hovmand
OCIC Award
12 Angry Men by Sidney Lumet
Special Mention: Woman in a Dressing Gown by J. Lee Thompson

References

External links
 7th Berlin International Film Festival 1957
1957 Berlin International Film Festival
Berlin International Film Festival:1957  at Internet Movie Database

07
1957 film festivals
1957 in West Germany
1950s in Berlin